Anna Riwkin-Brick or just Anna Riwkin (Surazh, Chernigov Governorate, Russia  – Tel Aviv 19 December 1970) was a Russian-born Swedish photographer.

Early life 
Anna Riwkin was born in Gomel into a Jewish family in the Russian Empire and came to Sweden with her parents in 1914. She studied ballet for three years as a child at the Stockholm Whitlockska samskolan School, and danced professionally for some time before an injured foot put an early stop to her career.

Photographer 
She was employed as an assistant to the court photographer Moisé Benkow in 1927, and started her own portrait and dance photography studio in Stockholm in 1928. She married the editor of the Swedish-Jewish Zionist periodical Judisk Krönika, translator of Russian, Yiddish and Czech, Daniel Brick in 1929, and marketed her work by displaying portraits of young writers and intellectuals from among her husband's acquaintances.

As a former dancer, she remained interested in dance as a subject of photography and illustrated a book on Swedish dance, Svensk Danskonst, published in 1932 and in the following year her photographs were exhibited in the international exhibition Dance and Movement in Paris.

She later illustrated a book on ballet in 1960, Balettskolan with texts by the choreographer Birgit Cullberg and the dance teacher Lilian Karina Vasarhelyi.

Recognition 
From the 1930s, Riwkin added journalistic work to her repertoire, collaborating on several books with the journalist Elly Jannes and the writer Ivar Lo-Johansson. Her first one-person show was held in 1936 in Kungsgatan in 1936.

After the Second World War, she worked for the Swedish photojournalistic magazine Se, for which she went on numerous trips both within Sweden and to foreign countries, photographing mainly women subjects in Greece, Yugoslavia, USA, Japan, Korea, Israel and India. In 1948 she published a book on Palestine.

From her photojournalistic and travel photography came the work selected by Edward Steichen for his 1955 globally-touring The Family of Man exhibition. One, of a family in the snow in Lapland, is typical of work she was later to publish in children's books, while the other, used to illustrate the idea of protest in the exhibition, is cropped image of a woman animatedly relating a story to neighbours from the couple's book Israel.

Children's picture books with photography
Riwkin-Brick contributed significantly to the growing use of photographs in children's picture-books, a genre that developed in the second half of the century.

In 1950, with the aim of promoting tolerance by introducing children from different countries to each other's lives, and international understanding through children's literature that would also be read by adults, Riwkin-Brick was commissioned by the UNESCO to make a photo book about the Sámi people. She persuaded Elly Jannes, a journalist for the journal Vi, to write the text for Vandrande by ('Wandering Village', also released as 'Nomads of the North'), published in 1950.  Anna Riwkin-Brick took many photos of a Sámi family's little girl Elle Kari that were not included in the Vandrande by edition, and Elly Jannes suggested they make another photo book about Elle Kari and to aim it at a child audience which was published in 1951.

It was the first Swedish picturebook with photos of everyday life of a child in a continuous story, and the first of many such books that the photographer was to make. It was a success. Translated into eighteen languages in editions with high print runs; 25,000 copies were printed for the first edition released in Germany, the United Kingdom, and the United States. Riwkin-Brick issued a series of 19 children's books (Children's Everywhere), each focusing on the everyday life of a child in a particular place or country. For nine of these books, Astrid Lindgren wrote the text and authors for others include Hebrew author Lea Goldberg who contributed the text for Eli bar i Israel (Eli Lives in Israel, 1964); Cordelia Edvardson, an immigrant from Germany to Sweden and author of the autobiographical novel Briinnt barn (Burnt Child, 1985), wrote the text for Mirjam bar i Kibbutz (Mirjam Lives in a Kibbutz, 1969); Riwkin-Brick's sister Eugenie Soderberg penned the text of Makihana (1961); and Vera Forsberg contributed the texts for Gennet bar i Etiopien (Gennet Lives in Ethiopia, 1967) and Salima bar i Kashmir  (Salimar Lives in Kashmir, 1970). Sales of Riwkin's children's books totalled 900,000 copies. In 2014 the Israeli director Dvorit Shargal searched for the children in the books and made a film (Where is Elle Kari and what happened to Noriko-san?) about what had been happening to the children after these books were published. Noiriko and Eva from the books were able to meet up again in Tokyo.

Photo agency 
In 1960 Riwkin established the photo agency Full Hand with Gösta Glass, Gustav Hansson, Bo Dahlin and Rolf Blomberg.

Her book Medmänniskor ('Fellow Beings'), in which she rephotographed her friends of the 1920s; dancers, artists, gypsies and the Sámi child Elle Kari (of her first children's book), was published in 1962.

Award and legacy 
Anna Riwkin-Brick received the Elsa Beskow Medal in 1963, the first time it was awarded to a photographer instead of an illustrator.

Riwkin died in 1970 of cancer in Israel. On the instruction of her will, her photographs were donated to Moderna museet's Fotografiska Museet in Stockholm.

Exhibitions

 1936 Anna Riwkin ateljé, Kungsgatan, Stockholm (solo)
 1938 Forsners Utsällningshall, Stockholm (solo)
 1953 Bankhallen, Stockholm (solo)
 1954 Museum Tel-Aviv, Israel (solo)
 1955 The Family of Man international travelling exhibition (group)
 1957 Barnbilder vid KF's International Kongress (solo)
 1968 Stockholms Stadsmuseum, Stockholm
 1969 A Trip Around the World, Museum Tel-Aviv, Israel (solo)
 1972 Galleri Heland, Stockholm (solo)

Posthumous exhibitions of photographs by Anna Riwkin-Brick were held at the Moderna museet, Stockholm:

 10 December 1977 – 5 March 1978, 
 14 February – 23 May 2004

Publications

Publications about Anna Riwkin-Brick
 
 Catalogue of an exhibition at Fotografiska museet, 10 December 1977 – 5 March 1978.

References

Further reading 
 

1908 births
1970 deaths
People from Surazh
People from Chernigov Governorate
Jews from the Russian Empire
Emigrants from the Russian Empire to Sweden
Swedish photographers
Portrait photographers
Swedish women photographers
Swedish Jews
Swedish people of Russian-Jewish descent
20th-century women photographers
Documentary photographers
20th-century Swedish women
Women photojournalists